Kumarapuram is a small village in Trincomalee district in Sri Lanka. The village was founded in 1981 by Kumarathurai, after whom it is named. It was the scene of the Kumarapuram massacre in 1996.

Photos
 Pictures of Kumarapuram village

References

 Trincomalee District in February 1996: Focusing on the Killiveddy Massacre, UTHR(J) Information Bulletin No.10, Date of Release: 2 March 1996

Villages in Trincomalee District